The Men's Freestyle 70 kg was a competition featured at the 2022 European Wrestling Championships, and was held in Budapest, Hungary  on March 28 and 29.

Medalists

Results 
 Legend
 F — Won by fall

Main Bracket

Repechage

Final standing

References

External links
Draw

Men's freestyle 70 kg